Sir Edmund Ralph Verney, 6th Baronet (born 28 June 1950) succeeded to the title of 6th Baronet Calvert, of Claydon House, Buckinghamshire, on 17 August 2001.

Personal life
Verney is the son of Sir Ralph Verney, 5th Baronet, and Mary Vestey. He married Daphne Primrose Fausset-Farquhar, daughter of Colonel Hamilton Farquhar Fausset-Farquhar, in March 1982 and they have two children: Andrew Nicholas Verney (b. 1983) and Ella Verney (b. 1985).
     
He was educated at Harrow School, London, and went to the University of York. He is a fellow of the Royal Institution of Chartered Surveyors.

He held the office of High Sheriff of Buckinghamshire from 1998 to 1999.

References

1950 births
People educated at Harrow School
Alumni of the University of York
Baronets in the Baronetage of the United Kingdom
High Sheriffs of Buckinghamshire
British landowners
Edmund
Living people